United Nations Security Council resolution 842, adopted unanimously on 18 June 1993, after reaffirming Resolution 743 (1992) concerning the United Nations Protection Force (UNPROFOR) and Resolution 795 (1992) which authorised its presence in the Republic of Macedonia, the Council welcomed an increase in the number of peacekeeping personnel in the country.

The resolution welcomed the announcement of the United States to deploy an additional 300 troops in Macedonia by July 1993, alongside 700 Scandinavian troops already in the country.

See also
 Breakup of Yugoslavia
 List of United Nations Security Council Resolutions 801 to 900 (1993–1994)
 United Nations Preventive Deployment Force
 Yugoslav Wars

References

External links
 
Text of the Resolution at undocs.org

 0842
 0842
1993 in Yugoslavia
1993 in the Republic of Macedonia
 0842
June 1993 events